Lindhagen is a surname. Notable people with the name include:

Albert Lindhagen (1823–1887), Swedish city planner, lawyer and politician
Anna Lindhagen (1870–1941), Swedish politician 
Carl Lindhagen (1860–1946), Swedish lawyer, socialist politician and pacifist
Erik Lindhagen (born 1987), Swedish ice hockey centre

See also
Lindhagenbukta, is a bay at the northern side of Nordaustlandet, Svalbard